Andrews Avenue station is SEPTA Route 102 trolley stop in Collingdale, Pennsylvania. The station is officially located at Woodlawn & Andrews Avenues. This is the third to last station stop on the Route 102 line, and the second to last stop to run along Woodlawn Avenue.

Trolleys arriving at this station travel between 69th Street Terminal in Upper Darby, Pennsylvania and Chester Pike (US 13) in Sharon Hill, Pennsylvania. The station has a shed with a roof where people can go inside when it is raining. This shed is located on the north side of the grade crossing with Andrews Avenue at the end of a sidewalk platform. Because the stop is in a residential area, no parking is available.

Station layout

External links

 Station from Andrews Avenue from Google Maps Street View

SEPTA Media–Sharon Hill Line stations